Alfred Hickman (25 February 1873 – 9 April 1931) was an English actor. He was married to actress Nance O'Neil. He appeared in 35 films between 1914 and 1931.

Selected filmography

 Are You a Mason? (1915)
 A Woman's Past (1915)
 The Flames of Johannis (1916) (*writer)
 [[The Witch (1916 film)|The Witch]] (1916)
 The Iron Woman (1916)
 The Fall of the Romanovs (1917)
 The Lone Wolf (1917)
 The Final Payment (1917)
 The Passing of the Third Floor Back (1918)
 The Venus Model (1918)
 On the Quiet (1918)
 In Pursuit of Polly (1918)
 The Make-Believe Wife (1918)
 Little Miss Hoover (1918)
 The Love Cheat (1919)
 Piccadilly Jim (1919)
 Erstwhile Susan (1919)
 The Fear Market (1920)
 The Shadow of Rosalie Byrnes (1920)
 Civilian Clothes (1920)
 The Enchanted Cottage (1924)
 The Rescue (1929)
 The Phantom of Paris (1931)

References

External links

1873 births
1931 deaths
English male film actors
English male silent film actors
Male actors from London
20th-century English male actors
Burials at Forest Lawn Memorial Park (Glendale)